La Queue may refer to:
La Queue du Marsupilami, 1987 comic album relating the adventures of the fictional character Marsupilami
La Queue-en-Brie in the Val-de-Marne département, France
La Queue-lez-Yvelines in the Yvelines département, France